Ilami Halimi (born 8 November 1975) is a Macedonian former footballer of Turkish ethnicity who played as a midfielder.

Club career 
 Potrosnik Beltinci (1998–1999)
 NK Čakovec (1999–2000)
 NK Varteks (2000–2003)
 Pobeda Prilep (2003–2004)
 Škendija 79 (2004)
 Lokomotiv Plovdiv (2004–2007)
 Olimpik Baku (2008)
 Kastoria (2008–2009)
 DAC Dunajská Streda (2009–2011)

International career
He made his senior debut for Macedonia in a November 2002 friendly match against Israel in Skopje and has earned a total of 4 caps, scoring no goals. His final international was an August 2005 FIFA World Cup qualification match against Finland.

References

External links

1975 births
Living people
People from Vrapčište Municipality
Macedonian people of Turkish descent
Association football midfielders
Macedonian footballers
North Macedonia international footballers
NK Beltinci players
NK Čakovec players
NK Varaždin players
FK Pobeda players
KF Shkëndija players
PFC Lokomotiv Plovdiv players
AZAL PFK players
Kastoria F.C. players
FC DAC 1904 Dunajská Streda players
Slovenian PrvaLiga players
First Football League (Croatia) players
Croatian Football League players
Macedonian First Football League players
First Professional Football League (Bulgaria) players
Azerbaijan Premier League players
Football League (Greece) players
Slovak Super Liga players
Macedonian expatriate footballers
Expatriate footballers in Slovenia
Macedonian expatriate sportspeople in Slovenia
Expatriate footballers in Croatia
Macedonian expatriate sportspeople in Croatia
Expatriate footballers in Bulgaria
Macedonian expatriate sportspeople in Bulgaria
Expatriate footballers in Azerbaijan
Macedonian expatriate sportspeople in Azerbaijan
Expatriate footballers in Greece
Macedonian expatriate sportspeople in Greece
Expatriate footballers in Slovakia
Macedonian expatriate sportspeople in Slovakia